Vincent can be used as a first name OR a surname (last name). Notable people with the surname include:

A. Vincent, Malayalam film director and cinematographer
Alex Vincent (actor) 	 
Alex Vincent (drummer) 	 
Angela Vincent, biologist 
Arthur Vincent (politician), Irish politician and barrister
Ashley Vincent, English footballer
Beverly M. Vincent 	 
Bev Vincent (born 1961), Canadian novelist, short story writer and chemist, working in Texas 	 
Brooke Vincent (born 1992), English actress	 
Cerina Vincent (born 1979), American actor and writer
Charles Wilson Vincent British chemist
Charlotte Vincent, British choreographer
Chuck Vincent
Clinton D. "Casey" Vincent, USAF general, fighter ace
Colin Vincent 	 
Cyril Vincent (1902–1968), South African cricketer	 
David Vincent (born 1965), American musician	 
Edgar Vincent, 1st Viscount D'Abernon
Edgar L. Vincent (1851–1936), American politician, newspaper editor, farmer, writer, and politician
Edward Vincent (1934–2012), US politician, Californian state senator
Edward A. Vincent
Edward F. Vincent (1881–1940), New York politician 
Fay Vincent 	 
Francis Thomas Vincent Jr. 	 
François-Elie Vincent 	 
Frank Vincent, American actor, musician, author and entrepreneur
Gene Vincent (1935–1971), American rock and roll musician	 
George Vincent (disambiguation) 	 
Georgette Vincent, All-American Girls Professional Baseball League player
H. Vincent (Jean Hyacinthe Vincent)
Henriette Vincent (1786–1834), French botanical painter
Holly Vincent
Hugh Vincent (1862–1931), Welsh rugby player 
Innocent Vincent 	 
Isabel Vincent 	 
Jamie Vincent 	 
Jan-Michael Vincent (1945–2019), American actor	 
Jay Vincent 	 
Jean Vincent (footballer) 	
Jean Hyacinthe Vincent
John Jervis, 1st Earl of St Vincent (1735-1823), British Admiral of the Fleet
John Vincent (general), British general 	 
John Vincent (historian), British historian 	 
John Carter Vincent 	 
June Vincent 	 
Justin Vincent 	 
Kary Vincent (born 1969), American football player
Kary Vincent Jr. (born 1999), American football player
Keydrick Vincent 	 
Kira Vincent-Davis 	 
Kyle Vincent 	 
Lou Vincent, New England cricketer 	 
Marcel Vincent
Mark Sinclair Vincent or Vin Diesel	 
Marjorie Vincent
Mary Ann Vincent
Ned Vincent, English footballer
Nick Vincent (musician)
Nick Vincent (baseball) 
Norah Vincent
 Patrice Vincent, Canadian soldier killed in the 2014 Saint-Jean-sur-Richelieu ramming attack
Phil Vincent, British motorcycle pioneer 	 
Pierre H. Vincent 	 
Pierre L. J. Vincent 	 
Ra Vincent, set decorator 
Rhonda Vincent 	 
Richard Vincent, Baron Vincent of Coleshill 	 
Richard Vincent (playwright) 	 
Robert Vincent (disambiguation)
Sam Vincent (basketball)
Sam Vincent (voice actor) 
Sonny Vincent
Stanley Vincent (1897–1976), senior commander in the Royal Air Force	 
Sténio Vincent 	 
Steven Vincent, American author and journalist	 
Strong Vincent
Swale Vincent British physician
Ted Vincent (born 1956), American football player
Tim Vincent 	
Tom Vincent (pianist), Australian jazz pianist and composer 	 
Tony Vincent 	 
Troy Vincent 	 
Vinnie Vincent
Vincent (Surrey cricketer), English cricketer
Vincent (singer), full name Vincent Pontare, a Swedish singer

Surnames from given names
English-language surnames
French-language surnames